Taube is a surname. It may refer to:

People
 Taube family, a Baltic German noble family

Persons
 Aino Taube (1912–1990), Swedish film and theatre actress
 Arvid Taube (1853–1916), Swedish politician and noble
 Astri Taube (1898–1980), Swedish sculptor, married to Evert Taube
 Carl Taube (1939–1989), American statistician
 Carlo Taube (1897–1944), Austro-Hungarian pianist, composer, conductor
 Evert Taube (1890–1976), Swedish author, artist, composer and singer, married to Astri Taube
 Hedvig Taube (1714–1744), Swedish noble and salonist, official royal mistress to King Frederick I of Sweden
 Helene Taube (1860–1930), Baltic German noblewoman
 Henry Taube (1915–2005), Canadian-born American chemist awarded the 1983 Nobel Prize in Chemistry
 Karl Taube (born 1957), American Mesoamericanist, archaeologist, epigrapher and ethnohistorian
 Mel Taube (1904–1979), American football, basketball, and baseball player and coach
 Mikhail Taube (1869–1961), Russian lawyer, statesman, and historian
 Mortimer Taube (1910–1965), American library scientist
 Nils Taube (1928–2008), Estonian-born British fund manager
 Robert Taube (1880–1961), Russian-born German actor
 Sven-Bertil Taube (1934–2022), Swedish singer and actor

See also
 Taub (surname)
 Daub (surname)
 Taubes (surname)
 Teyber, Austrian family of musicians sometimes spelled this way

German-language surnames
Jewish surnames
Swedish-language surnames
Surnames from nicknames